Rialto station (also known as the John Longville Depot) is a Metrolink San Bernardino Line station located at 292 South Palm Avenue in Rialto, in San Bernardino County, California, just south of Rialto Avenue off of Riverside Avenue. It has 489 free parking spaces.

The station is owned by the city of Rialto, and was designed as a replica of the former 1888-built Atchison, Topeka and Santa Fe Railway frame-built structure. Omnitrans does not directly serve the station, but route #22 serves Rialto and Riverside a short block away, and route #15 serves Riverside and Merrill, three blocks to the south.

The station is named for former Assemblymember and Rialto Mayor John Longville.

References

External links 

Omnitrans
June 30, 1998 Photo (Surviving Santa Fe Depots; California)

Metrolink stations in San Bernardino County, California
Rialto, California
Railway stations in the United States opened in 1993
1993 establishments in California